The Affair is a 2004 drama film directed by Carl Colpaert and starring Kelsey Oldershaw, Andy Mackenzie, and Horacio Le Don.

Premise

Jean (Kelsey Oldershaw) is a bored housewife living in a designer house with her architect husband Paul (Horacio Le Don), a man of success who is so self-centered and controlling that he forgets his relationship obligations to his wife. Jean has residual scars from a traumatic childhood experience and her needs go beyond the wifely role, searching for some degree of excitement, passion and fulfillment not available in her marriage. At a local dance club she meets Viggo (Andy Mackenzie), a bohemian passionate, live for the moment guy who sweeps Jean off her feet in an affair that produces disaster in her marriage.

Cast

 Kelsey Oldershaw
 Andy Mackenzie
 Horacio Le Don
 Ronnie Gene Blevins as Donny
 Charles Fathy

Accolades 
The film received four Gold Remi awards at the 2004 Worldfest.

External links
 
 The Affair MySpace page

2004 films
2004 drama films
American drama films
2000s English-language films
Films directed by Carl Colpaert
2000s American films